Protectorate of missions is a term for the right of protection exercised by a Christian power in a Muslim or other non-Christian country with regard to the persons and establishments of the missionaries. The term does not apply to all protection of missions, but only to that permanently exercised in virtue of an acquired right, usually established by a treaty or convention (either explicit or tacit), voluntarily consented to or accepted by the non-Christian power after more or less compulsion. The object of the protectorate may be more or less extensive, as it may embrace only the missionaries who are subjects of the protecting power or apply to the missionaries of all nations or even to the native Christians who are their recent converts. 

This article deals with a historical approach to the 'legitimation' of protectorates by the need to facilitate the 'holy' duty of spreading the Christian faith, as invoked by Catholic, Orthodox and Protestant colonial/imperial powers.

Background

Both Einhard and Notker the Stammerer refer to envoys traveling between the courts of Charlemagne, king of the Franks, and Harun al-Rashid. They mention the exchange of gifts and friendly discussions about Christian access to holy sites. This exchange of embassies was due to the fact that they both were interested in subduing the Umayyad emirs of Córdoba. Charlemagne and his successors made use of any concessions to establish pious and charitable foundations there, to protect the Christian inhabitants and pilgrims, and to ensure the availability of Christian worship.

The destruction of the Arabian Empire by the Turks put an end to this first protectorate, and for reasons that were not purely religious, led to the Crusades, as a result of which Palestine was conquered from the Saracens and became a Latin, French-speaking kingdom. The Christian rule was later replaced by that of Islam, but during the three centuries of Crusades, which had been undertaken and supported mainly by France, the Christians of the East had grown accustomed to look to that country for assistance in oppression or to gain more leverage in their dealings with the Ottomans, while France valued its increasingly important role in the region and its accompanying geopolitical benefits.

France in the Levant
The protectorate began to assume a contractual form in the sixteenth century, in the treaties concluded between the kings of France and the Ottoman Sultans, which are historically known as Capitulations. At first this name designated the commercial agreement conceded by the Sublime Porte to Latin merchants (first to Italians, starting with Genoese in 1453), and arose from the fact that the articles of these agreements were called capitoli ('chapters' in the Italian redaction). 

Francis I was the first king of France who sought an alliance with the Ottomans. The pretext used by Francis was the protection of the Christians in Ottoman lands. The objective was to find an ally against the House of Habsburg. By compelling Austria to spend its forces in defense against the Ottomans in the East, he hoped to weaken it and render it unable to maintain its power in the West. 

As early as 1528, Francis I had appealed to Suleiman the Magnificent to restore to the Christians of Jerusalem a church which the Ottomans had converted into a mosque. The Sultan refused on the plea that his religion would not permit alteration of the purpose of a mosque, but he promised to maintain the Christians in possession of all the other places occupied by them and to defend them against all oppression. The Franco-Ottoman alliance caused quite a scandal in the Christian world, but endured for many years, since it served the objective interests of both parties.

Henry IV continued the policy of a Franco-Ottoman alliance and received an embassy from Sultan Mehmed III in 1601. In 1604, a "Peace Treaty and Capitulation" was signed between Henry IV and the Ottoman Sultan Ahmed I. It granted numerous advantages to France in the Ottoman Empire. The capitulations were made to entice and encourage commercial exchange with Western merchants. According to their terms traders entering the Ottoman Empire were exempt from local prosecution, local taxation, local conscription, and the searching of their domicile. Ahmed expanded the capitulations given to France, specifying that merchants from Spain, Ragusa, Genoa, Ancona and Florence could trade under the French flag.In the capitulations of 20 May 1604 appear two clauses relative to the protection of pilgrims and of the religious in charge of the Church of the Holy Sepulchre in consideration of and for the honor and friendship of the French king. 

The result of this friendship was the development of the Catholic missions, which began to flourish through the assistance of Henry IV and his son Louis XIII, who introduced the system of capitulations to Moroco. The Franco-Moroccan Treaty (1631) gave France preferential tariffs, the establishment of a Consulate and freedom of religion for French subjects. Before the middle of the seventeenth century, various religious orders (Capuchin, Carmelite, Dominican, Franciscan and Jesuit) were established, as chaplains of the French ambassadors and consuls, in major Ottoman cities (Istanbul, Alexandria, Smyrna, Aleppo, Damascus, etc.), Lebanon and the islands of the Aegean Archipelago. They assembled the Catholics to instruct and confirm them in the Catholic faith, opened schools to which flocked the children of all rites, relieved the spiritual and corporal miseries of the Christians in the Turkish prisons, and nursed the pest-stricken, which last office made many martyrs of charity.

French influence reached its peak during the reign of Louis XIV, whose prestige, due to his victories and conquests, was significant at the Porte. Louis XIV gave the missionaries material and moral support. Thanks to him, the often precarious tolerance, on which the existence of the missions had previously depended, was officially recognized in 1673, when on 5 June, Mehmed IV not only confirmed the earlier capitulations guaranteeing the safety of pilgrims and the religious guardians of the Holy Sepulchre, but signed four new articles, all beneficial to the missionaries. The decrees secured the tranquil possession of their churches, explicitly to the Jesuits and Capuchins, and in general "to the French at Smyrna, Saïd, Alexandria, and in all other ports of the Ottoman Empire".  

The reign of Louis XIV marked the apogee of the French Protectorate in the East, for not only the Latin missionaries of all nationalities, but also the heads of all Catholic communities, regardless of rite or nationality, appealed to the king, and at the recommendation of his ambassadors and consuls to the Porte and the pashas, obtained justice and protection.

In 1740 the French succeeded in securing the renewal of the capitulations, with additions which explicitly confirmed the right of the French Protectorate. By the eighty-seventh of the articles signed on 28 May 1740, Sultan Mahmud I declared: "...The bishops and religious subject to the Emperor of France living in my empire shall be protected while they confine themselves to the exercise of their office, and no one may prevent them from practicing their rite according to their custom in the churches in their possession, as well as in the other places they inhabit." 

In subsequent treaties between France and Turkey, the capitulations were not repeated verbatim, but they are recalled and confirmed (e. g. in 1802 and 1838). The various regimes which succeeded the monarchy of Louis IX of France and of Louis XIV all maintained in law, and in fact, the ancient privilege of France in the protection of the missionaries and Christian communities of the Orient.

In 1860 conflict broke out between the local Druze and Christians at Mount Lebanon. The unrest spread leading to riots and mob violence which devastated the Christian quarter of Damascus. Following the massacres and an international outcry, the Ottoman Empire agreed on 3 August 1860 to the dispatch of up to 12,000 European soldiers to reestablish order. France, under Emperor Napoleon III supplied half.

The Far East
Beginning in the 15th century, popes granted to the Crown of Portugal the right to designate candidates for the sees and ecclesiastical benefices in the vast domains acquired through the expeditions it sponsored in Africa and the East Indies. This is sometimes called the Portuguese Protectorate of Missions, but more properly the "Portuguese Patronage" (Padroado). It allowed the King of Portugal to benefit from a certain portion of the ecclesiastical revenues of his kingdom, and it carried the condition that he should send good missionaries to his new subjects, and that he should provide with a fitting endowment the dioceses, parishes and religious establishments established in his acquired territories. The Holy See contested Portugal's assertion of these rights to regions it claimed but never conquered, including  the greater part of India, Tong-king, Cochin-China (both in present Vietnam), Siam and especially China. Portugal tried to exert influence through its ambassadors to China in the 18th century, instructing them to intervene as much as possible to protect missionaries and native Christians from ongoing persecution in the provinces. 

Portugal's authority was not comparable to the protectorate regime exercised by France in the Near East or Far East in later centuries and Portugal's rights as protector were never recognized by a host nation. No Christian power exercised a protectorate in China before the 19th century.

France

The French Protectorate, as far as a regular convention is concerned, dates from the middle of the nineteenth century, but the way was prepared by the protection which French statesmen had accorded the missionaries for almost two centuries. The zeal and liberality of Louis XIV permitted the foundation of the great French Jesuit mission, which in less than fifteen years (1687–1701) more than doubled the number of apostolic workers in China, and never ceased to produce most capable workers. The first official relations were formed between France and China when the missionaries brought there by the Amphitrite, the first French vessel seen in Chinese waters (1699), presented gifts from Louis XIV to the Kangxi Emperor. The two monarchs shared the expense of erecting the first French church at Peking: the emperor donated land within the limits of the imperial city and the building materials, the French king paid for the labor, the decoration and the magnificent liturgical ornaments. Several other churches erected in the provinces through the munificence of Louis XIV increased the prestige of France throughout the empire. 

Jean Joseph Marie Amiot arrived in China in 1750. He composed a Manchu-French dictionary. Under Louis XV the mission in China, like many other things, was somewhat overlooked, but the government did not wholly neglect it. It found a zealous protector in Louis XVI's minister Henri Bertin, but it felt keenly the suppression of the Society of Jesus. After the suppression, the Jesuits of Beijing resigned from the Society of Jesus and remained as secular priests. A handful of French missionaries, such as Lazarists or members of the Society of Foreign Missions, assisted by some Chinese priests, also helped preserve the Faith throughout the persecutions of the early nineteenth century, during which several of them were martyred.

When the English, after the First Opium War, imposed on China the Treaty of Nanking (1842), they did not at first ask for religious liberty, but the murder of the Lazarist John Gabriel Perboyre (11 September 1840) becoming known, they added an article stipulating that thenceforth a missionary taken in the interior of the country should not be tried by the Chinese authorities, but should be delivered to the nearest consul of his country. 

In 1843, King Louis Philippe sent Envoi extraordinaire Marie Melchior Joseph Théodore de Lagrené to China to negotiate a commercial treaty to secure the same privileges as the British.On October 1844, Lagrené and Qiying concluded the Treaty of Whampoa, which also legalized the practice of Christianity in China.

The Second Opium War was ended by the Convention of Peking, which contained an article which stipulated freedom for the missionaries to preach and for the Chinese to practice Christianity. The French ambassador was made receiver of all property previously confiscated, to be  transferred to the Christians of the localities concerned. This recognized the general and exclusive right of protection granted to the French over all the Catholic missions in China.

The foregoing historical sketch shows that the ancient French right of protection over the missions, in both Turkey and China, was established as much by constant exercise and by services rendered as by treaties. For some time, the government continued to preserve the prerogative of its predecessors, and continued to lend protection, though much diminished, to the Catholic missionary undertakings—even to those directed by religious who were proscribed in France (e. g. it subsidized the Jesuit schools in Syria). The advantages of the protectorate were too obvious even to the least clerical of the ministers for them not to attempt to retain them, whatever the resulting contradictions in their policy. France gained through the protectorate in the Levant and the Far East a degree of prestige and a moral influence which no commerce or conquest could ever have given provided.

Other countries
Germany
In 1875, at the time of the negotiations between France and (nominally Ottoman) Egypt with regard to judiciary reform, the German government declared that it "recognized no exclusive right of protection of any power in behalf of Catholic establishments in the East, and that it reserved its rights with regard to German subjects belonging to any of these establishments". Against French claims to an exclusive protectorate and in support of its own claims to exercise the privileges of a protectorate, Germany later cited the language agreed to by Austria-Hungary, France, Germany, Great Britain, Italy, Russia, and the Ottoman Empire in article 62 of the Treaty of Berlin in 1878: "Ecclesiastics, pilgrims and monks of all nationalities traveling in Turkey in Europe or Turkey in Asia shall enjoy the same rights, advantages and privileges. The official right of protection of the diplomatic and consular agents of the Powers in Turkey is recognized, with regard both to the above-mentioned persons and to their religious, charitable and other establishments in the Holy Places and elsewhere." The passage immediately following this paragraph in the article was overlooked: "The acquired rights of France are explicitly reserved, and there shall be no interference with the statu quo in the Holy Places." Thus the protection guaranteed to all ecclesiastics, etc., no matter what their nationality or religion, as well as the generally recognized right of all the powers to watch over this protection, was to be understood with the reservation of the "acquired rights" of France, i.e. of its ancient protectorate in behalf of Catholics. This protectorate was therefore really confirmed by the Treaty of Berlin. 

But as a matter of fact, the influence of Russia, which assumed the protectorate of Orthodox Christians, already greatly affected the standing which the ancient French Protectorate had assured to Catholics in Palestine and especially in Jerusalem.
 
Moreover, Emperor Wilhelm II of Germany installed Protestantism with a magnificent church beside the Holy Sepulchre in 1898. As a sort of compensation he ceded to German Catholics the site of the Dormition of the Blessed Virgin which he obtained from the Sultan, where a church and a monastery were erected and, together with the other German establishments, placed under the protection of the German Empire, without deference to the ancient prerogative of France.
 
A similar situation prevailed in China. First, in 1888, Germany obtained from the Chinese imperial Government that German passports should insure the same advantages to the missionaries as those secured at the French legation. At the same time the German Catholic missionaries of Shandong, who had much to endure from the infidels, were on several occasions offered the powerful protection of the German Empire. Mgr. Anzer, the vicar Apostolic, decided to accept it, after having, as he declares, several times sought unsuccessfully the aid of the French minister. In 1896 the German ambassador at Peking received from Berlin the command to support energetically the claims of the Catholic missionaries and even to declare that the German Empire would pledge itself to defend against all unjust oppression the persons and property of the mission of Shandong, together with freedom of preaching, in the same measure in which such had been formerly guaranteed by the French Protectorate. The murder of two of the Shandong missionaries in November 1897 afforded the occasion for a more solemn affirmation of the new protectorate, while it furnished a long-sought pretext for the occupation of the Jiaozhou Bay area.

Austria
Austria concluded various treaties with the Ottoman Empire in 1699 (Treaty of Karlowitz), 1718 (Treaty of Passarowitz), and 1739 (Treaty of Belgrade) that secured a right of protection over "the religious" in the Empire and even at Jerusalem, though never including a guarantee of liberty of worship. Austria never exercised authority as a protector except in the countries bordering on Habsburg Austria, notably Albania and Macedonia. In 1848 the Austrian Protectorate was extended to the Christian missions in the Sudan and Nigritia, which were in the care of Austrian priests. When the Coptic Catholic hierarchy was restored in Egypt by Pope Leo XIII in 1895, the new patriarch and his suffragans placed themselves under the protection of Austria.

Position of the Holy See
The Holy See defended the French Protectorate on several occasions. Whenever missionaries sought protection from any other country, the French diplomatic corps complained to Rome, and the Congregation for the Propagation of the Faith reprimanded the missionaries and reminded them that France had the sole right to safeguard their interests in non-Christian nations. This happened in 1744 and 1844. Italy sought to establish its own protectorate by patronizing missionary activities and winning the allegiance of those it supported, but the Congregation for the Propagation of the Faith refused to support its efforts. Instead, on 22 May 1888, the Congregation wrote to the Italian missionaries in the Levant and the Far East to remind them that "the Protectorate of the French Nation in the countries of the East has been established for centuries and sanctioned even by treaties between the empires. Therefore, there must be absolutely no innovation in this matter; this protectorate, wherever it is in force, is to be religiously preserved, and the missionaries are warned that, if they have need of any help, they are to have recourse to the consuls and other ministers of France." On 1 August 1898, Pope Leo XIII wrote to Cardinal Benoît-Marie Langénieux, Archbishop of Reims:
 
In parallel with this recognition of French exclusivity, the Holy See declined to establish its own diplomatic relations with Turkey and China, even when supported by those governments. Leo XIII rejected any proposal to exchange legates or ambassadors at the instance of French diplomats, who told him those countries had less interest in amicable relations with the Holy See than in evading the authorities granted to the French protectorate.

Assessments
Critics of the protectorate said that the authorities that granted the privilege to a Christian nation did so under duress, that the system contributed to and exacerbated anti-Christian sentiment in those countries, and that it allowed Christian missionaries to disregard the sensibilities of the non-Christian population. Those who see benefits in the protectorate system contend that it was the best means of protecting missionaries and their activities and allow that it required that the foreign power minimize its meddling and exercise discretion in asserting its rights. As an example, one study noted that the superior of the mission of southeast Chi-li resolved its issues directly with local authorities and sought intervention from the French legation only three times during the difficult period from 1862 to 1884. They believed abuses were minimal, especially in comparison with the benefits.

End of the French Protectorate

See also
Christianity and colonialism
Congregation for the Evangelization of Peoples

Notes

References

The following sources are cited by the Catholic Encyclopedia:
Concerning the Levant. -- Charrière, Négociations de la France dans le Levant (4 volumes, Paris, 1848) 
Schopoff, Les réformes et la protection des chrétiens en Turquie 1673-1904, Firmans, bérats, ... traités (Paris, 1904)
Pélissié du Rausas, Le régime des capitulations dans l'empire ottoman (Paris, 1902-5), I, 190-202 
II, 80-176; Rey, De la protection diplomatique et consulaire dans les échelles du Levant et de Barbarie (Paris, 1899)
De Saint-Priest, Mémoires sur l'ambassade de France en Turquie, suivis du texte des traductions originales des capitulations et des traités conclus avec la Sublime Porte (Paris 1877)
Charmes, Politique extérieure et coloniale (Paris, 1885), 303-84, 387-428
Le régime des capitulations par un ancien diplomate (Paris, 1898)
Burnichon, Les capitulations et les congregations religieuses en Orient, in Etudes, LX (1893), 55

History of Christianity in China
Foreign relations of France
Holy See–Turkey relations
China–Holy See relations
Catholic missions